The Gaelic surname Mac Suibhne is a patronymic form of Suibhne and means "son of Suibhne". The personal name Suibhne means "pleasant".

Anglicised forms of Mac Suibhne include: McSeveney, McSeveny, McSween, McSweeney, McSweeny, McSwiney, Sweaney, Sween, Sweeney, Sweenie, Sweeny, Sweney, Swiney, Swinney, A lenited variant form of Mac Suibhne is Mac Shuibhne. Anglicised forms of the latter Gaelic name include: (possibly) Mawhinney, McQueen, McQueeney, McQueenie, (possibly) McWhinney, Queen, Queeney, Wheen.

One particular family that has borne the surname Mac Suibhne is Clann Suibhne. Members of this Scottish family settled in Ulster as gallowglass warriors in the Middle Ages.

People

mac Suibhne
Dubhghall mac Suibhne, 13th-century Argyllian magnate

Mac Suibhne
Aodán Mac Suibhne, 21st-century hurling referee
Aodh Mac Suibhne, 16th-century Irish gallowglass
Domnall na Madhmann Mac Suibhne, 15th-century Irish gallowglass
Eóin Mac Suibhne, 14th-century Scottish nobleman
Micheál Mac Suibhne, 18th-century poet
Murchadh Mac Suibhne, 13th-century Argyllian magnate
Suibhne MacAnrahan, brother to the High King of Ireland, who built Castle Sween in the late 11th century

Citations

References

Irish-language masculine surnames
Surnames of Irish origin
Scottish surnames